Klaus Michler (born 15 May 1970 in Stuttgart) is a German former field hockey player who competed in the 1992 Summer Olympics and in the 1996 Summer Olympics.

References

External links
 

1970 births
Living people
German male field hockey players
Olympic field hockey players of Germany
Field hockey players at the 1992 Summer Olympics
Field hockey players at the 1996 Summer Olympics
Olympic gold medalists for Germany
Olympic medalists in field hockey
Sportspeople from Stuttgart
Medalists at the 1992 Summer Olympics
1998 Men's Hockey World Cup players
20th-century German people